McGruff may refer to:

 McGruff (rapper) (born 1975), an American recording artist
 McGruff the Crime Dog
 McGruff, a monster truck
 An episode of the American television series Webster
 A character in the 2004 film Chasing Liberty